Mare Vint (born Mare Mänd; 15 September 1942 – 10 May 2020) was an Estonian graphic artist. In her work, Vint mostly depicted an "ideal landscape".

Life 
Vint was born in Tallinn, where she graduated from 9th Secondary School in 1961. 
From 1962 to 1967, she studied at the Estonian SSR State Art Institute; she graduated as a glass artist.
From 1967 to 1969, she worked as a High School art teacher in Tallinn, then as a freelance artist. 
She was a member of the Estonian Artists' Union since 1973.

She worked in ink and pencil drawing, and mostly lithography since 1972. 
In Mare Vint's work of the second half of the 1960s and the beginning of the 1970s, a style emerged, characterized by the black-and-white contrast of the drawings, in which color is more conditional.

She was awarded the Order of the White Star IV class, in 2015.

References 

1942 births
2020 deaths
20th-century Estonian women artists
21st-century Estonian women artists
20th-century Estonian painters
21st-century Estonian painters
Modern painters
Estonian women painters
Graphic artists
Estonian Academy of Arts alumni
Recipients of the Order of the White Star, 5th Class
Artists from Tallinn